Aleksandr Yevgenievich Kolobaev (born 18 May 1962 in Moscow, RSFSR, USSR) is a football referee. Judicial career began in 1985. Premier Division Matches judge since 2000. In 2007, he was included in the top five of arbitrators according to the CFA. Chief referee final Russian Cup 2010. Referee National Category. The coach-teacher.

In 2004 Kolobaev was the victim of the attack, which experts linked to his professional activities, after which the board of Russian football referees nominated safeguards requirement, otherwise, reserving the right to boycott the matches of the national championship.

References

External links
 Арбитры чемпионата России 2008 at sport-express.ru 
 
 

1962 births
Living people
Russian football referees
Recipients of the Medal of the Order "For Merit to the Fatherland" II class
Sportspeople from Moscow